Bryce Leatherwood (born February 4, 2000) is an American country singer. He is the winner of season 22 of the American talent competition The Voice at the age of 22, earning a $100,000 prize and a deal with Universal Music Group. Competing on the team coached by Blake Shelton, he has the distinction of being the first winner of the show to be in the Instant Save in the playoffs.

Early life
Leatherwood was born February 4, 2000, in Woodstock, Georgia to Hope and Cliff Leatherwood. He grew up singing and playing the ukulele throughout middle school. Leatherwood attended Sequoyah High School and often performed at assisted living facilities, where he sang and played the guitar for residents.

Career

2022: The Voice 

In 2022, Leatherwood entered the twenty-second season of The Voice. In his blind audition, he sang Blake Shelton's rendition of Conway Twitty's "Goodbye Time". Three of the four coaches, John Legend, Gwen Stefani, and Blake Shelton turned their chairs for him. Leatherwood chose to become a member of Team Blake. He would go on to advance to the finale, being named the winner of the season on December 13, 2022.

Personal life
Leatherwood attended Georgia Southern University, studying for a degree in business. He currently resides in Statesboro, Georgia.

References

The Voice (franchise) winners
The Voice (franchise) contestants
Living people
2000 births
Republic Records artists